Best Evidence may refer to:

 Best Evidence, a documentary television series
 Best evidence rule, a common law rule of evidence
 Best Evidence, a book by David S. Lifton
 "UFO Best Evidence", an episode of the documentary television show Unexplained Mysteries
 Best Evidence Encyclopedia - reviews of research on reading instruction programs